Daniel Padilla, a Filipino actor and recording artist has been featured in many music videos, and appeared in some commercials. This is a list of music videos and commercials featured Padilla.

Music videos

Commercial

References

Videography
Padilla, Daniel